Monte di Procida (locally ) a small comune (municipality) in the Metropolitan City of Naples in the Italian region of Campania, located about  west of Naples, facing the island of Procida. Monte di Procida includes the small island of San Martino, which was occupied by the Germans during World War II. Its territory is included in the Campi Flegrei Regional Park.

Twin towns
 Ithaca, Greece
 Procida, Italy
 Molise, Italy, since 2001

See also
Misenum

References

Cities and towns in Campania
Phlegraean Fields